"Chances Are" is a popular song with music by Robert Allen and lyrics by Al Stillman. It was published in 1957.

Chart performance
The song was one of many compositions by the Stillman-Allen team that were chart hits in the 1950s. It was listed on Billboards "Most Played by Jockeys" survey for Johnny Mathis, charting in 1957, and was inducted in the Grammy Hall of Fame Award in 1998. The song reached No. 4 on Billboards Best Sellers in Stores survey, along with its flip "The Twelfth of Never", which Mathis initially disliked. The song, released on both 45 RPM and 78 RPM formats, was also included on the 1958 Mathis compilation Johnny's Greatest Hits. The album was certified a gold record on June 5, 1959. In Canada, the song reached number 3 on the CHUM Charts.

Later recordings
Mathis re-recorded the song in 1996 as a duet with Liza Minnelli for her album Gently.

Pop culture references
 A portion of this song can be heard in Close Encounters of the Third Kind.

References

Johnny Mathis songs
1957 songs
1957 singles
Columbia Records singles
Songs with music by Robert Allen (composer)
Songs with lyrics by Al Stillman
Number-one singles in the United States
Grammy Hall of Fame Award recipients